Stanley Joseph Boroski (born July 14, 1963) is an American former professional baseball coach. He was the bullpen coach for the Tampa Bay Rays of Major League Baseball (MLB).

Playing career
Boroski was drafted by the Milwaukee Brewers in the 20th round of the 1981 Major League Baseball Draft as a catcher out of Buckeye South High School in Tiltonsville, Ohio.  After two years in the Brewers system, he signed with the Kansas City Royals as a pitcher, where he remained for four years.  Boroski underwent two rotator-cuff surgeries during his career.

Coaching career
Boroski was named a coach for the Rays on December 17, 2009, following Brian Anderson.  He served for the Tampa Bay Rays for 13 years retiring in 2022 as their Bullpen Coach. Prior to joining the Rays, he had spent 18 years with the Houston Astros organization, where he had served as both a scout and coach.

Personal
Boroski has a degree in biology from Ohio University.  He resides in St. Cloud, Florida with his wife, Carol, and two children, Sarah and Clayton.

External links

Tampa Bay Rays - Stan Boroski biography

1963 births
Living people
Baseball catchers
Baseball coaches from Ohio
Baseball players from Ohio
Beloit Brewers players
Fort Myers Royals players
Gulf Coast Royals players
Houston Astros scouts
Major League Baseball bullpen coaches
Minor league baseball coaches
Ohio University alumni
People from Martins Ferry, Ohio
People from St. Cloud, Florida
Pikeville Brewers players
Sportspeople from Greater Orlando
Tampa Bay Rays coaches